Tāmrakār (Devanagari: ताम्रकार) is a caste of coppersmiths and other metal casters found in Nepal and India. In Nepal, the Tamrakars are found among the Newar community of the Kathmandu Valley.

Etymology and names 

The name Tamrakar is derived from the Sanskrit words "tamra", meaning copper, and "kaar", refers to maker, Crafts man

In Nepal Bhasa, they are known as Tamo (Tamrakar from 
REDIRECT Bhaktapur
) or Tamot or Tawo (Tamrakar from Kathmandu). They are skilled craftsmen with a distinct culture among Newars. They follow both Hinduism & Buddhism.

In India, the various names for the caste include Tamrakar (in Madhya Pradesh), Tambatkar, Tamera, Thathera, Thathara, Kasar, Kasera, Kansara (in Gujarat), Kangabanik (West Bengal), Otari, Twasta Kasar and Tambat (Maharashtra), Tamta (Gharwal & kumaon). In Goa, they claim Brahmin status and call themselves Twashta Kasar Brahmin. In northern India, they also identify themselves as "Haihaivanshi Tamrakar Samaj", claiming Kshatriya descent from Sahasrabahu Arjuna and Haihaya dynasty.
"Haihaivanshi Tamrakar Samaj" is also populated in Chhattisgarh.

Geography 

In Nepal, Tamrakars are spread all over the Kathmandu Valley, but are mostly concentrated in the heart of Patan, Kathmandu, Bhaktapur and Achham Nepal. Many live in various towns across Nepal. In Kathmandu, the main Tamrakar neighborhoods are Maru at Durbar Square, Yatkha Baha and Mahabati (Mahabouddha). In Patan, they are spread around the whole Patan area.

Traditional occupation

Tamrakars are traditional coppersmiths who make household utensils of copper and brass according to the division of labour practiced from ancient times. Jewelry and ritual objects made of silver are other products. They are also known for making traditional musical instruments like the ponga and the payntah, long horns made of copper.

Many Tamrakars of Kathmandu participated in the traditional Tibet trade, and used to operate shops in Lhasa in Tibet, Ladakh in India and other trade centers on the Silk Road. Following the Sino-Indian War in 1962 when the caravan route linking India and Tibet through Sikkim was shut down, the centuries-old trade system came to an end, and the merchants and craftsmen based in Tibet closed up shop and returned home to Nepal.

Today, Tamrakars are involved in handicraft, retail trade and the professions, and can be found among the leading names in business and industry.

Culture

The Tamrakars of Maru in Nepal have the task of playing the payntāh (long horn) during the Samyak festival, the greatest Newar Buddhist celebration which is held once every 12 years in Kathmandu and in which each Urāy caste has a duty.

During the Yenya festival (also known as Indra Jatra) held in Kathmandu, a Tamrakar family of Maru has the responsibility of bringing out the procession of the goddess Dagin (दागिं) (alternative name: Dagim). Similarly, a Tamrakar dancer from Maru plays the part of Daitya in sacred dances.

Society 
Tamrakars (mostly from 
REDIRECT Patan
) have formed a society "Tamrakar Samaj" consisting of 650+ members.  Tamrakar Samaj organizes various social events like Bratabandha, Gupha Rakhne etc. as well as works actively in promotion of Tamrakars.

Notable people
 Ashapatti Tamrakar (1904–1942), pioneer optician and herbalist.
 Purna Kaji Tamrakar (1920–2009), trader and author.
 Ramesh Tamrakar (1950 - 2018) Very Popular Newa (Nepal Bhasa) Singer, Who also sang many beautiful Nepali songs in Radio Nepal. Also held important government position like General Manager Of Rastriya Naach Ghar. Decorated By Gorkha Dakshin Bahu I
 Ram Krishna Tamrakar, politician.

References

External links
 Tamrakar Samaj, Nepal

Newar caste system
Social groups of Nepal
Social groups of India
Newari-language surnames